Mutha Is Half A Word is the debut album by American comic and actress LaWanda Page, released in 1971 on the Laff Records label.

Description
The comic, born in Ohio and raised in St. Louis, MO as Alberta Peal, used only the first name of her stage name for the duration of her recordings with Laff Records and for the duration of her career as a stand-up comedian, which began in the 1960s after careers as a strip dancer and vaudeville performer. Some of Page's most famous stand-up monologues are included in this album including "The Blind Woman" and "Smell the Sardines", bits she performed on TV later in her career. She also parodies the hit "Winchester Cathedral" in which she explains that a man working at a funeral parlor discovered a cork in a man's butt, taking the cork out only to hear the butt singing the song.

The title of the book Mutha Is Half a Word: Intersections of Folklore, Vernacular, Myth, and Queerness in Black Female Culture (Black Performance and Cultural Criticism) is a reference to this album as it stands as a stereotype of modern black female humor.

Track listing
"Husbands & Whores"
"The Desk Clerk"
"Yo-Yo"
"Vice Squad"
"Three Pregnant Prostitutes"
"Two Winos"
"Sampson"
"69 to 88"
"The Preacher & The Funeral"
"All But Wipin'"
"The Pilot"
"Daddy's Nuts"
"Two Cowboys"
"Santa Claus"
"Madam & Her Daughters"
"The Milk Company"
"The Train"
"The Owl"
"The Chinaman"
"Adam & Eve"
"Assault"
"Son in the Morning"
"The Drunk & the Bartender"
"Hole in the Head"
"Banging the Blinds"
"Winchester Cathedral"
"Mother Frocker"
"The Sheep"
"The Blind Woman"
"Smell the Sardines"

References

1971 albums
LaWanda Page albums
Laff Records albums